General elections were held in Panama on 5 August 1928 to elect both a new President of the Republic and a new National Assembly.

Background
Prior to the elections there was a split in the Liberal Party, resulting in two Liberal candidates for president. There was no Conservative candidate.

Campaign
In 1928 President Rodolfo Chiari wrested control of the Liberal Party apparatus from Belisario Porras Barahona. The president also controlled four of seven posts on the national electoral board. The combination of these two factors gave Rodolfo Chiari nearly insurmountable powers and severely curbing his opponents' ability to compete effectively in elections.

Results

President

National Assembly

Aftermath
Immediately after President Arosemena's resignation on 2 January 1931, the Supreme Court decided that the election of the First, Second and Third Vice-Presidents in October, 1930, was unconstitutional and invited Ricardo Joaquín Alfaro Jované (Minister to the United States), who was elected First Vice-President in 1928, to become President of the Republic.

References

Panama
1928 in Panama
Elections in Panama
Presidential elections in Panama
Election and referendum articles with incomplete results